Susan Garrett is a former Democratic member of the Illinois Senate, who represented the 29th District from 2003 to 2013, and the 59th district of the Illinois House of Representatives for four years previously. The 29th district includes all or parts of Bannockburn, Deerfield, Des Plaines, Fort Sheridan, Glencoe, Glenview, Highland Park, Highwood, Knollwood, Lake Bluff, Lake Forest, Mount Prospect, Niles, Northbrook, Park Ridge, Prospect Heights and Riverwoods.

Redistricting by Democratic legislators following the 2000 census made veteran Republican senator Kathy Parker, vulnerable, and Garrett won the seat in 2002. While in the Illinois House, Garret proposed to limit campaign contributions from government employees to politicians for whom they worked, as well as from special interests, and upon election to the state Senate, she was named vice chair of the Government Ethics Reform Committee. In July 2011, Garrett announced she would not seek re-election to the state senate in 2012.

Personal background
Garrett lives in Lake Forest with her husband, Scott. They have two adult children, Brett and Elizabeth. Garrett received her bachelor's degree in political science from Lake Forest College in 1994, and worked as a marketing consultant before becoming a full-time legislator.

References

External links
Bills Committees
Project Vote Smart - Senator Susan Garrett (IL) profile
2006 2004 2002 2000 1998 campaign contributions

1950 births
Democratic Party Illinois state senators
Lake Forest College alumni
Living people
Democratic Party members of the Illinois House of Representatives
People from Lake Forest, Illinois
Women state legislators in Illinois
21st-century American politicians
21st-century American women politicians